Coleophora macrobiella is a moth of the family Coleophoridae. It is found in southern France and Spain.

The larvae feed on Camphorosma monspeliaca. They create a very slender, dark grey, tubular silken case of 15–16 mm. Larvae can be found from October to May.

References

macrobiella
Moths of Europe
Moths described in 1885